Dung most often refers to animal feces. Dung may also refer to:

Science and technology
 Dry animal dung fuel
 Manure
 Cow dung
 Coprolite, fossilized feces
 Dung beetle

Art
 Mundungus Fletcher or "Dung", a character in the Harry Potter novels
 The Dung, percussionist and singer for the Swedish folk music duet Philemon Arthur and the Dung
 Carburetor Dung, a Malaysian punk band which is also known as "DUNG"

Others
 Dung, Doubs, a commune in the Doubs department in the Franche-Comté region in eastern France
 Nguyen Tan Dung, Vietnamese communist politician